Open Systems & Information Dynamics (OSID) is a journal published by World Scientific. It covers interdisciplinary research in mathematics, physics, engineering and life sciences based upon the fields of information processing, storage and transmission, in both quantum and classical settings, with a theoretical focus. Topics include quantum information theory, open systems, decoherence, complexity theory of classical and quantum systems and other models of information processing.

Abstracting and indexing 
The journal is abstracted and indexed in:
 COMPUMATH Citation Index
 Current Contents/Engineering, Computing and Technology
 Current Contents/Physical, Chemical and Earth Sciences
 Inspec
 ISI Alerting Services
 MATH
 Science Citation Index Expanded (also known as SciSearch)
 Statistical Theory and Method Abstracts
 Zentralblatt MATH

References

External links 
 Journal Website

Mathematics journals
World Scientific academic journals